Italobdella is a genus of annelids belonging to the family Piscicolidae.

The species of this genus are found in Europe.

Species:

Italobdella ciosi 
Italobdella epshteini

References

Annelids